Leucanopsis mancina is a moth of the family Erebidae. It was described by William Schaus in 1920. It is found in Guatemala.

References

mancina
Moths described in 1920